The 14th arrondissement of Paris, officially named arrondissement de l'Observatoire (meaning "arrondissement of the Observatory", after the Paris Observatory), is one of the 20 arrondissements of the capital city of France. It is situated on the left bank of the River Seine and contains most of the Montparnasse district. Although today Montparnasse is best known for its skyscraper, the Tour Montparnasse, and its major railway terminus, the Gare Montparnasse, these are both actually located in the neighboring 15th arrondissement.  The district has traditionally been home to many artists as well as a Breton community, arrived at the beginning of the 20th century upon the creation of the Montparnasse railway terminus.

Universities located in the 14th arrondissement also include the Cité Internationale Universitaire de Paris, which is located near the Parc Montsouris, the Stade Charléty and the catacombs; and the Paris School of Economics.

Geography
The land area of this arrondissement is 5.621 km2 (2.17 sq. miles, or 1,389 acres).

Demography
The 14th arrondissement attained its peak population in 1954 when it had 181,414 inhabitants. It continues to have a high density of both population and business activity with 132,844 inhabitants and 71,836 jobs as of the last census, in 1999.

Historical population

Immigration

Economy
Aéroports de Paris has its head office in the arrondissement. In addition Société d'exploitation de l'hebdomadaire Le Point (SEBDO Le Point), the company that operates Le Point, has its head office in the arrondissement.

SNCF, the French rail company, formerly had its head office in Montparnasse and the 14th arrondissement.

Government and infrastructure
La Santé Prison, operated by the Ministry of Justice, is in the arrondissement.

The head office of the Agency for French Education Abroad (AEFE), the French international schooling network, is in the arrondissement.

Culture
The International Astronomical Union head office is located on the second floor of the Institut d'Astrophysique de Paris. The Théâtre Rive Gauche is located at 6, rue de la Gaîté. Several contemporary art galleries are also located in the 14th arrondissement, such as the Fondation Cartier pour l'Art Contemporain, the Musée Adzak and the Gallery of Montparnasse.

Cityscape

Places of interest
 Paris Catacombs museum
 Cimetière du Montparnasse
 Fondation Cartier pour l'Art Contemporain
 Gare Montparnasse
 Michael Servetus statue
 Montparnasse area
 Musée Lenine
 Musée Jean Moulin
 Paris Observatory
 La Santé Prison
 Tour Montparnasse
 Sainte-Anne Hospital Center

Main streets and squares

 Rue de l'Arrivée
 Place Denfert-Rochereau
 Rue Delambre
 Rue du Départ
 Place Edgar Quinet
 Avenue du Maine
 Boulevard du Montparnasse
 Boulevard Raspail

References

External links